Jonathan Pierce Daviss (born February 28, 2000) is an American actor. He starred as Pope Heyward in the Netflix drama series Outer Banks.

Early life
Daviss was raised in Conroe, Texas, and attended Conroe High School where he played football. He has a younger sister. His mother sold their house and they moved to California for him to pursue an acting career.

Filmography

Film

Television

References

External links
 

1999 births
Living people
Male actors from Texas
People from Conroe, Texas
Conroe High School alumni